Paul Albert Attanasio (born November 14, 1959) is an American screenwriter and film and television producer. He has twice been nominated for the Academy Award for Best Adapted Screenplay, for Quiz Show (1994) and  Donnie Brasco (1997).

Early life
Paul Attanasio was born in The Bronx, New York City, the son of Connie, a real estate broker, and Joseph Attanasio, a commercial consultant. He is the great-grandson of immigrants from Positano on Italy's Amalfi coast. He grew up in the Pelham Bay section of the Bronx, and later in Tenafly, New Jersey, where he attended public high school. He is a 1981 graduate of Harvard College, where he lived in Currier House, and earned his Juris Doctor degree at Harvard Law School in 1984.

Career

Attanasio was a film critic for The Washington Post from 1984 to 1987. He started writing for television with the CBS sitcom Doctor Doctor and the NBC crime drama Homicide: Life on the Street, for which he holds a 'Created by' credit.

In 1995 he won a BAFTA Award for Best Adapted Screenplay for his work on Quiz Show. He later wrote the screenplays for the thriller Disclosure, the gangster thriller Donnie Brasco, the science fiction thriller Sphere, and the political thrillers The Sum of All Fears and The Good German. While he was making films, he started Heel & Toe Films, with a first-look production pact at Paramount Pictures on July 17, 1998.

In 2000, he returned to television as an executive producer of and writer for the medical drama Gideon's Crossing, as well as the pilot for R.U.S.H. On September 10, 2001, the Heel & Toe Films production company had signed a deal with Studios USA. In 2004, Attanasio, alongside his then-wife and business partner Katie Jacobs and David Shore, pitched what would become House, of which he was credited as an executive producer. He also created Tommy and co-created Bull, which premiered in 2020 and 2016, respectively.

In 2017, it was confirmed that he would be writing and executive producing a new Amazon Video series titled Tong Wars.

Personal life
Formerly married to his business partner Katie Jacobs, he is now married to Amanda Benefiel, an artist. With Katie Jacobs, he shares three children, Annabelle, John, and Grace. Attanasio is the brother of Mark Attanasio, a Los Angeles investment manager who is the principal owner of the Milwaukee Brewers.

TV appearances
Attanasio was featured in The Dialogue interview series. In an interview with producer Mike DeLuca, he describes how he went from lambasting movies as a "snotty" Washington Post film critic to developing rewarding creative partnerships with Oscar-winning directors Robert Redford, Barry Levinson, and Steven Soderbergh.

Filmography

Writer 
 Quiz Show (1994)
 Disclosure (1994)
 Donnie Brasco (1997)
 Sphere (1998)
 The Sum of All Fears (2002)
 The Good German (2006)

Creator 
 Homicide: Life on the Street (1993–1999)
 Gideon's Crossing (2000–2001)
 House (2004–2012, uncredited)
 Bull (2016–2022)
 Tommy (2020)

References

External links

1959 births
Best Adapted Screenplay BAFTA Award winners
Film producers from New York (state)
American people of Italian descent
Television producers from New York City
American male screenwriters
American writers of Italian descent
Screenwriters from New York (state)
Harvard Law School alumni
Harvard College alumni
Living people
The Washington Post people
Writers from the Bronx
People from Teaneck, New Jersey
Screenwriters from New Jersey
Film producers from New Jersey
Television producers from New Jersey